Audrey Ursula Smith (21 May 1915 – 3 June 1981) was a British cryobiologist, who discovered the use of glycerol to protect human red blood cells during freezing.

Early life and education
Audrey Smith was born in India on 21 May 1915, and baptized at Chindwara, India, one of two children of Alan Kenyon Smith, who worked for the Indian Civil Service, and his wife, Gertrude May Smith.

In 1935, she graduated from King's College, London with a first class honours BSc in general science, and in 1936, with a BSc from Bedford College for Women in physiology, again with first class honours.

Career
Smith was house physician at King's College Hospital, in 1942, and clinical pathologist from 1943 to 1944. She was a pathologist at Epsom public health clinic from 1944 to 1945, and for the Nottingham Emergency Public Health Laboratory Service from 1945 to 1946.

From 1946 to 1970, she was a researcher at the National Institute for Medical Research. She worked initially with Sir Alan Parkes and Christopher Polge, with the goal of developing a viable technique for the cryopreservation of animal semen. This was unsuccessful. However, a subsequent freak accident—Smith dropped a bottle which broke and splattered a hot plate, and the resulting odour caused her to realize that the bottle had been mislabeled—led Smith to successfully experiment with glycerol in cryopreservation, and she discovered the first practical cryoprotectant molecule.

In 1969, Smith was a joint winner with Polge and Parkes of the John Scott Award of the city of Philadelphia for their method of low temperature preservation of living cells and tissues. Parkes thought that Smith and Polge should also have been included in his award of the Cameron Prize of the University of Edinburgh, but "the University authorities thought otherwise". Audrey Smith was awarded the Kamerlingh Onnes medal in 1973.

She was on the staff of the Royal National Orthopaedic Hospital at Stanmore, from 1970 to 1981.

Smith studied the use of glycerol to preserve blood during freezing, and also studied resuscitation of mammals from hypothermia.

Death and legacy
Smith died in London on 3 June 1981.

According to her obituary in The New York Times, "her work in the development of techniques to protect frozen sperm cells from bulls has been credited with contributing to major advances in cattle breeding and animal husbandry".

One of the tunnel boring machines constructing the Thames Tideway Scheme tunnel is named 'Ursula' taking on Smith's middle name. Ursula is excavating a 5 kilometre section of tunnel between Kirtling Street in Battersea and Chambers Wharf in Hammersmith.

Publications

 Polge, C.; A. Smith, and A. Parkes. "Revival of spermatozoa after vitrification and dehydration." Nature (London), 164:666, 1949.
 Smith, A. U. "Prevention of Haemolysis during Freezing and Thawing of Red Blood Cells." Lancet 2 (1950):910–911.
 
 
 Smith, A. U. Biological Effects of Freezing and Supercooling, Williams and Wilkinns, London, 1961.
 Pegg, D. E. "The history and principles of cryopreservation." Semin Reprod Med, 20(1):5–13, 2002.

References

1915 births
1981 deaths
20th-century British biologists
20th-century British women scientists
Alumni of Bedford College, London
Alumni of King's College London
British pathologists
British women biologists
National Institute for Medical Research faculty